In New Zealand, tangata whenua is a Māori term that translates to "people of the land". It can refer to either a specific group of people with historical claims to a district, or more broadly the Māori people as a whole.

Etymology
According to Williams' definitive Dictionary of the Māori Language, tangata means "man" or "human being", whilst tāngata (with the macronated "ā") is the plural, and means "people". Tangata—without the macron—can also mean "people" in reference to a group with a singular identity.

Whenua means both "land" and "placenta" (again referencing Williams, who lists five definitions). It is an ancient Austronesian word with cognates across the Malayo-Polynesian world, from Malay benua (now meaning "continent"), Visayan *banwa and to Rapa Nui henua; ultimately from Proto-Austronesian *banua. Unlike European thought, wherein people own land, in the Māori worldview the land is regarded as a mother to the people. The relationship to land is not dissimilar to that of the foetus to the placenta. In addition, there are certain Māori rituals involving burying the afterbirth of a newborn in ancestral land, which may further illustrate the word whenua meaning both "land" and "placenta".

Contexts
 In the context of tribal descent and ownership of land, tangata whenua are the people who descend from the first people to settle the land of the district; the mana may reside with later arrivals. 
 At a particular marae, the tangata whenua are the owners of the marae, in contradistinction to the manuhiri (guests). After the welcoming ceremony on a marae, the guests may be afforded the temporary, honorary status of tangata whenua, and may even be invited to participate as locals as the ceremonies continue. 
 Tangata whenua has also become a New Zealand English term with specific legal status.

Law and custom
The indigenous peoples of New Zealand may be divided into three levels of kinship, on which traditional governance was based.

Whānau 
The smallest level, whānau, is what Westerners would consider the extended family, perhaps descended from a common great-grandparent. Traditionally a whānau would hold in common their food store (their forest or bush for hunting birds and gathering or growing plant foods, and a part of the sea, a river or a lake for gathering eels, fish, shellfish, and other seafood). These food stores were fiercely protected: when one's resources could no longer support a growing whānau, war with a neighbouring tribe might eventuate.

Hapū 
The next level, hapū (sub-tribe), is a group of several related whānau, and was traditionally the primary governance unit. In war, and when decisions needed to be made in negotiations with outside tribes, whānau leaders would gather and the hapū would make collective decisions.

Iwi 
Several (or many) hapū can trace their ancestry, usually on the male line, back to a particular waka, the ocean-going canoe upon which the common ancestors of that tribe arrived in Aotearoa New Zealand, and this unified level is called the iwi. Until the British arrived, the iwi was not a governance unit, but was, among other things, a way to establish kinship and commonality—a kind of "who's who". For example, it is part of the formal greeting ceremony of "pōwhiri" when one group visits another.

However, under British and subsequent New Zealand law, typically an iwi forms itself into a legally recognised entity, and under the Treaty of Waitangi these entities are accorded special rights and obligations under New Zealand law, when they are recognised as tangata whenua. Iwi must have a provable relationship with a specific area of geography, and if this is acknowledged by the national or local authority, they become the legal tangata whenua. (Some areas may have several groups given tangata whenua status, which can make the process more complex).

When, for example, a major real-estate development is proposed to the territorial authority, the tangata whenua must be consulted, although the mere fact that "consultation" take place does not mean that the views of the tangata whenua will necessarily be listened to. When bones are found, the tangata whenua are supposed to be called. In addition to these sorts of legally mandated requirements, when a person wishes to have land blessed, or when a sudden death occurs, an elder (kaumātua or tohunga) of the tangata whenua may be asked to perform a cleansing ritual.

Tangata tiriti
The notion of tangata whenua is sometimes contrasted with tangata tiriti—literally, "the people of the Treaty". The latter term refers to non-indigenous New Zealanders who are in the country by virtue of the Treaty of Waitangi. Although some see it as close to (but not necessarily synonymous with) the term pākehā, the peoples who have arrived through the auspices of the monarchs of Great Britain and then of New Zealand range in ethnicity, ancestry and roots from most parts of the world including the continents of Europe, Asia, Africa and the Americas, as well as many islands in the Pacific. As used notably by Judge Eddie Durie, the notion of tangata tiriti underlines partnership and acceptance. Unlike tangata whenua, the term tangata tiriti is not commonly used in New Zealand.

See also

 Resource Management Act 1991
 Tangatawhenua.com

Notes

References
 A. Salmond, Hui, A Study of Maori Ceremonial Gatherings. Reed, Wellington, 1975.

Iwi and hapū
Māori culture
Māori words and phrases
 Tangata whenua
Treaty of Waitangi
Māori society